Karalina is a given name. It is a version of Caroline and a variant of Carolina

Karalina Savenka (born 1998), Belarusian cyclist
Johanna Maria Karalina [Lina] Karsten birthname of Mary Caroline Bisley (1836-1917), German settler of New Zealand

See also

Karolina